Cine Q, formerly known as Cine Station Q, is an South Korean movie theater chain. It has 41 screens in 6 theatres in South Korea.

References

External links
 

Cinema chains in South Korea
2017 establishments in South Korea
Next Entertainment World